The Chameli Devi Jain Award for Outstanding Women Mediaperson is an Indian journalism award named after Chameli Devi Jain, an Indian independence activist who became the first Jain woman to go to prison during India's independence struggle. The award was instituted in 1980 by The Media Foundation and is given to women in the field of journalism. According to Business Standard, the award is "perhaps India's longest running media award for women".

The Media Foundation was founded in 1979 by B. G. Verghese, Lakshmi Chand Jain, Prabhash Joshi, Ajit Bhattacharjea and N. S. Jagannathan. The award was instituted in 1980 by Verghese and the family of Chameli Devi. The criteria for selection include social concern, dedication, courage and compassion in the individual's work. Journalists in print, digital and broadcast are eligible including photographers, cartoonists and newspaper designers; the entries are judged by an independent jury. Preferences are given to rural or small-town journalists and journalists in regional Indian languages.

Neerja Chowdhury won the inaugural award in 1981. In 2015, Supriya Sharma of Scroll.in became the first online journalist to receive the award. The most recent award was given to Aarefa Johari.

Recipients

See also 
 Ramnath Goenka Excellence in Journalism Awards

References 
 Notes

Citations

Bibliography

Awards established in 1980
1980 establishments in India
Indian journalism awards